Luke Simmonds (born 7 December 1979) is an English former professional snooker player.

Career

Early career
Simmonds won the World Under-21 Championship in Malta in 1998, defeating Robert Murphy 11–2 in the final, before beating Ryan Day 11–10 to become World Amateur champion in the same year.

He first experienced competitive snooker during the 1997/1998 season, when he entered three tournaments; in the Benson & Hedges Championship, he won his first match 5–0 against Rajan Sharma, but lost in the next round 1–5 to Philip Seaton. First-round defeats in Event 1 of that season's UK Tour and qualifying for the World Championship followed, and he thereafter took a year-long hiatus from competing.

Upon his return in 1999, Simmonds entered the 2000 World Championship, losing in the fifth pre-qualifying round. During the 2000/2001 season, he played on the Challenge Tour, reaching the semi-finals at Event 1 - where he lost 1–5 to Andrew Norman - and the quarter-finals at Event 3, where Kurt Maflin beat him 5–3, before reaching his first career final at Event 4. Drawn against nineteen-year-old Shaun Murphy, Simmonds lost 2–6, but his performances over the course of the season were sufficient for him to earn a place on the main tour.

Professional - 2001 to 2004 
Simmonds' debut season as a professional began well, as he recorded back-to-back victories over David McDonnell and Surinder Gill in the British Open, before losing in the third round 2–5 to Jonathan Birch. He could not progress any further than the last 96 in any other tournament, however, and a 5–10 loss to Barry Pinches at this stage of the 2002 World Championship meant he dropped off the tour after only one season.

Back in the amateur ranks, Simmonds once again found success, notably reaching his second final at Event 3 of the 2003 Challenge Tour. Michael Rhodes defeated him 6–5, but this was enough to assure him of a return to the main tour for the 2003/2004 season.

Simmonds began that season ranked 126th, but it heralded no more success than his first. He reached the last 80 in three tournaments - the 2004 Welsh Open, where he lost 4–5 to Patrick Wallace, the Irish Masters, where Andy Hicks defeated him 5–1, and the Players Championship, where he was whitewashed 5–0 by Murphy - but, after a 5–10 loss to Ian Preece in World Championship qualifying, he was ranked 94th at the season's conclusion. Although he had broken into the top 100 for the first time, he was again relegated from the main tour.

Amateur return
After a three-year break, Simmonds entered several Pontin's International Open Series events in the 2007/2008 season; he reached the last 16 at Event 2, but lost there 2–4 to Andrew Pagett.

He entered Q-School in 2011 and 2015 attempting to regain a place on the tour, and as a result of his performances in 2015, where he lost his final match in Event Two  to Paul Davison, he was allowed to participate as a wildcard entry in several ranking tournaments in the 2015/2016 season. However, Simmonds did not win a match; he lost 1–5 to Michael Leslie in the Shanghai Masters, 0–6 to Ali Carter in the International Championship, and 2–5 to Barry Hawkins in the German Masters, and led Robbie Williams 3–0 in the Welsh Open before succumbing 3–4.

In qualifying for the 2016 World Championship, Simmonds lost 2–10 to Liam Highfield; since his last involvement with the professional game, he has been active on the English amateur tour.

Performance and rankings timeline

Career finals

Non-ranking finals: 2

Pro-am finals: 2 (1 title)

Amateur finals: 9 (5 titles)

References

Living people
1979 births
Sportspeople from the Isle of Wight
English snooker players